Lansdowne House now 9 Fitzmaurice Place is the remaining part of a building to the south of Berkeley Square in central London, England, not to be confused with 57 Berkeley Square – opposite – a much later quadrilateral building which takes its name as an extra line of address. The name was for two decades Shelb(o)urne House, then its title matched its owning family's elevation to a higher peerage in 1784. It was frequently let, as a whole, to families of very high wealth or income. Some of its 18th-century interiors, among the best in London, were taken elsewhere. It was occupied by three British prime ministers, William Waldorf Astor, 1st Viscount Astor, widely believed to be the richest man in America at the time of his tenancy (1891–1893) and by Harry Gordon Selfridge in the 1920s. The owning family sold the property in 1929, two years after the death of the 5th Marquess, a prominent government frontbencher (cabinet minister).

The local authority had built an approach road in 1931 which saw the loss of approximately half of the rooms of its greater wing; it is today one of two buildings which open onto Fitzmaurice Place but is known as 9 Fitzmaurice Place. The surviving extent was granted Grade II* Listed Building status in 1970.

Current use
It houses the Lansdowne Club in Mayfair. It co-serves as an address of Fitzmaurice House Ltd, the International Wine and Food Society which may meet here and The Junior League of London.

History
It was designed by Robert Adam as a house for John Stuart, 3rd Earl of Bute but in 1763 he sold it (one year into its building) to William Petty, 2nd Earl of Shelburne (both men became Prime Minister); the structure was finished in 1768. Adam commissioned the local sculptor Thomas Carter the Younger to carve the chimney-pieces of his design. Shelburne retained Adam until 1771, when his wife died, with parts of the decoration still incomplete.  George Dance the Younger (in the 1790s of George III's reign) and Robert Smirke (at the end of his associated Regency) worked on the house.

From 1763 to 1929, it belonged to the seniormost branch of the Petty-FitzMaurice family, elevated from 1784 to a high peerage, as Marquesses of Lansdowne. In 1931, the house, in compensation seeing its extension built to the south-west, saw half of its greater original wing, the east wing, demolished to allow the street Fitzmaurice Place to be built. Since 1935, the residue accommodates the Lansdowne Club.

Its front private garden exceeded its building's footprint but was subject to another's restrictive covenants. Its main front lay further forward and was a garden front to this green expanse (between Berkeley Square and Devonshire House's gardens). This conservation guaranteed for Devonshire House on Piccadilly open aspects (greenery-covered land save for discreet fences/railings) up to and including all of Berkeley Square. These reasons are set out in the Square's article.

In 2022, Blackstone finalized an agreement to redevelop Lansdowne House as its European headquarters. Prime Minister Liz Truss called the agreement "a resounding vote of confidence in the United Kingdom as Europe’s leading financial centre."

Famous residents
Owner, resident:-
William Petty, 2nd Earl of Shelburne (later 1st Marquess of Lansdowne), British prime minister (1782–83)

Tenants:-
 John Stuart, 3rd Earl of Bute, British prime minister (1762–63)
 William Pitt the Younger, British prime minister (1783–1801, 1804–1806)
 William Waldorf Astor, 1st Viscount Astor, widely believed to be the richest man in America at the time (1891–1893)
 Archibald Primrose, 5th Earl of Rosebery, was a British Liberal statesman and Prime Minister (1894–1895)
 Harry Gordon Selfridge, founder of the Selfridges department store

Partial demolition and dispersal of name

In the 1930s, the Metropolitan Borough of Westminster Council decided to build a road from Berkeley Square to Curzon Street, which required the demolition of all the garden front rooms of Lansdowne House. One of Adam's three drawing rooms was removed and installed at the Philadelphia Museum of Art, while the Dining Room went to the Metropolitan Museum of Art in New York City. The façade was rebuilt in a modified form at the front of the reduced house; about half of the north-west corner has also been lost.

On 1 May 1935, the Lansdowne Club opened as a 'social, residential and athletic Club for members of social standing...'.  It comprises the remaining 18th-century rooms plus a large 1930s extension in the Art Deco style.

Many works of art, such as the Lansdowne Amazon and the Lansdowne Hercules, were also bought by American and British museums. The Lansdowne Hermes resides at the Santa Barbara Museum of Art in California. Other objects moved to Bowood House, the Lansdowne country house, where Adam had also worked, which remains in the family, though large parts of it were demolished in 1956.

A large office block, 57 Berkeley Square, with classical fronts and surrounding roads, occupies what was the garden. This still uses as line of its address the name of the old house. What is left of the house, with a 20th-century extension, is now called 9, Fitzmaurice Place.

Extensive renovations began in 2000.

Gallery

Notes and references
Footnotes

Citations

External links

The Lansdowne Club
 Lansdowne House entry from The DiCamillo Companion to British & Irish Country Houses
Europe in the age of enlightenment and revolution, a catalogue from The Metropolitan Museum of Art Libraries (fully available online as PDF), which contains material on this house (see index)
Period Rooms in the Metropolitan Museum of Art , a publication from The Metropolitan Museum of Art Libraries (fully available online as PDF), which contains material on this house (see index)

1935 establishments in England
Former houses in the City of Westminster
Petty-Fitzmaurice family
Georgian architecture in the City of Westminster
Buildings and structures in Mayfair
Philadelphia Museum of Art
Grade II* listed buildings in the City of Westminster
Grade II* listed houses in London
Art Deco architecture in London